1998 Empress's Cup Final was the 20th final of the Empress's Cup competition. The final was played at National Stadium in Tokyo on January 17, 1999. Prima Ham FC Kunoichi won the championship.

Overview
Prima Ham FC Kunoichi won their 3rd title, by defeating Nikko Securities Dream Ladies 1–0.

Match details

See also
1998 Empress's Cup

References

Empress's Cup
1998 in Japanese women's football